Eduardo Kopper (born 16 August 1965) is a Costa Rican alpine skier. He competed in two events at the 1984 Winter Olympics.

References

1965 births
Living people
Costa Rican male alpine skiers
Olympic alpine skiers of Costa Rica
Alpine skiers at the 1984 Winter Olympics
Sportspeople from San José, Costa Rica
20th-century Costa Rican people